Doping Panda was a Japanese rock group. They are part of Sony Music Japan's gr8 records! division, which includes bands such as Orange Range, Uverworld and Boom Boom Satellites. They released their first album "Performation" in 2001, and a second "PINK PANK" in 2002. Their third album, “We in Music” was released in 2004. In 2005, Doping Panda released two albums entitled "High Fidelity", and "High Pressure".  After being received very well by the Japanese Rock scene, the group went on a series of tours throughout the country, releasing their 2006 album "Dandyism", along with the hit singles "Miracle" and "Can't Stop Me". Their success solidified their status as an icon in the Japanese music scene and increased their fanbase throughout Asia.

Following up on their earlier successes, the band released their first DVD entitled "Live-Ism" in October 2006. On January 24, 2007, their new single "Can't Stop Me" was released. On June 6 of the same year they released an EP titled "High Brid", and on the 15th they appeared on the popular Japanese music program Music Station for the first time, and played the song "I'll be there" from their new EP. In 2012, they announced their breakup with their final live.

Discography

Albums

Studio albums

Compilation albums

Remix albums

Extended plays

Singles

References

External links 

Official website (Japanese/English)

Gr8! Records artists
Japanese rock music groups
Sony Music Entertainment Japan artists